Ozon Radio is a local radio station in Montenegro. Its headquarters are in Kolašin. It operates on the FM 97.6 MHz frequency.

History
Ozon Radio began broadcasting on December 30, 1999, on the FM 97.6 MHz frequency.

Radio stations in Montenegro